Mercy Memorial School is in Kanpur City, Uttar Pradesh, India.

References

Schools in Kanpur
Educational institutions established in 1984
1984 establishments in Uttar Pradesh